Westminster Seminary may refer to:
Westminster Theological Seminary, in Philadelphia, Pennsylvania
Westminster Seminary California, in Escondido, California